The Method is a 2005 thriller film directed by Marcelo Piñeyro and based on the 2003 play El mètode Grönholm by Jordi Galceran.

It stars Eduardo Noriega, Najwa Nimri, Eduard Fernández, Pablo Echarri, Ernesto Alterio, Natalia Verbeke, Adriana Ozores and Carmelo Gómez, as the only eight actors in the film.

Synopsis 

After an introduction showing the AZCA area of Madrid during a meeting of the International Monetary Fund and the World Bank with accompanying anti-globalization protests, the entire film happens within a corporate building (outdoor scenes shot by Torre Europa), mostly in a closed conference room.

The story tells of seven people that have been selected among several applicants for one final round to determine who will get an enviable, executive position for a mysterious corporation, Dekia. The seven applicants are submitted to a series of psychological tests - known as the "Grönholm Method" - that start eliminating the applicants one by one. It is warned at the beginning that one of the seven people is an employee of the corporation posing as an applicant to evaluate the others. As the applicants are discarded, the race for the position becomes more tense and sinister.
The tests reveal the weakness of each of the characters and their attitudes to company work. In the end the "mole" will be revealed and only one of them will get the desired position.

Cast
Eduardo Noriega as Carlos, a young well prepared executive.
Najwa Nimri as Nieves, a young well prepared executive. 
Eduard Fernández as Fernando, an older Spanish macho.
Pablo Echarri as Ricardo, a former Argentine unionist.
Ernesto Alterio as Enrique, interested in personnel selection methods.
Natalia Verbeke as Montse, the company secretary.
Adriana Ozores as Ana, a mature executive.
Carmelo Gómez as Julio, who valued his ethics over loyalty to the company.

Awards 
The film was nominated to five Goya Awards (Best Lead Actor (Fernández), Best New Actor (Echarri), Best Editing (Aledo), Best Screenplay (Gil and Piñeyro) and Best Supporting Actor (Gómez), winning in the last two categories. It also won in the Flanders International Film Festival and was nominated for Best Film in the Mar del Plata Film Festival. It also won the main award (The Audience Award) at Vilnius International Film Festival.

Footnotes
Similarities have been noted between this film and the 2009 film Exam.

See also 
 List of Spanish films of 2005
 List of Argentine films of 2005
 List of Italian films of 2005

External links 
 
 Adriana Ozores

2005 films
Spanish films based on plays
Italian films based on plays
Argentine films based on plays
Films shot in Madrid
Argentine independent films
2000s Spanish-language films
2000s French-language films
2000s Italian-language films
2005 thriller drama films
Films featuring a Best Supporting Actor Goya Award-winning performance
Films with screenplays by Mateo Gil
Italian independent films
Spanish independent films
2005 drama films
2005 independent films
2005 multilingual films
Argentine multilingual films
Italian multilingual films
Spanish multilingual films
2000s Spanish films
2000s Argentine films
2000s Italian films